Obourg is a town of Wallonia and a district of the municipality of Mons, located in the province of Hainaut, Belgium.

It was a municipality until the fusion of the Belgian municipalities in 1977.

History

It is the site of the first British soldier to be killed in the First World War, Private John Parr on 21 August 1914.

Agriculture

Obourg was known for its tobacco in the past.

See also 
 Canal du Centre (Belgium)
 River Obrecheuil

Gallery 

Sub-municipalities of Mons
Former municipalities of Hainaut (province)